Peetri River Landscape Conservation Area is a nature park which is located in Võru County, Estonia.

The area of the nature park is 500 ha.

The protected area was founded in 1959 to protect the bed and banks of Peetri River. In 2005, the protected area was designated to the landscape conservation area.

References

Nature reserves in Estonia
Geography of Võru County